King Sansang of Goguryeo (died 227, r. 196–227
) was the 10th ruler of Goguryeo, the northernmost of the Three Kingdoms of Korea.  He was the third son of the eighth king Sindae and the younger brother of the ninth king Gogukcheon, who died without an heir.

Family
Father: King Sindae (신대왕, 新大王)
Consort and their respective issue(s):
Queen, of the U clan (왕후 우씨, 王后 于氏); daughter of U So (우소, 于素) – No issue.
Unnamed woman from Jutong village (주통촌)
Prince Uwigeo (우위거, 憂位居)

Background and rise to the throne
Upon Gogukcheon's death, his queen Lady U supported Sansang's claim and had him placed on the throne.  She then became Sansang's queen.  This indicates that the custom of Levirate marriage was still practiced in Goguryeo, but also demonstrated Lady U's power in court.

Balgi, older brother to Sansang, led a rebel force attacking the capital, gaining military support of Chinese faction. Sansang had his younger brother Gyesu repel the attack, and Balgi committed suicide.

Sansang Goguryeo was later attacked by Han Dynasty China and forced to submit to the Han Dynasty.  In 209, the capital was moved to Jian by warlord Gongsun Kang of the Han Dynasty. In 217, he granted refuge to a thousand families from the Liaodong region.

Successor
In the eleventh lunar month of 208, the king chased a sacrificial boar to the village of Jutongchon, where he met a young woman and spent the day with her.  The queen heard of this and sent royal forces, failing to kill her owing to her assertion that she conceived. The woman gave birth to a son and became a royal concubine. The son was made crown prince in 213 and later became King Dongcheon.

Sansang died during 227, the 31st year of his reign, and was buried in Sansang-neung.

See also
History of Korea
Three Kingdoms of Korea
List of Korean monarchs
Gongsun Kang

References

Goguryeo rulers
227 deaths
3rd-century monarchs in Asia
2nd-century monarchs in Asia
Year of birth unknown
2nd-century Korean people
3rd-century Korean people